Sami Hamed (born March 16, 1990), known professionally as Skinny (stylized as $kinny), is a Saudi-American hip hop rapper born in Riyadh, Saudi Arabia.

Early life
Hamed was born in Riyadh, Saudi Arabia.  Born to an American mother and Saudi-Arabian father, his parents met in California. After they separated, Skinny spent summers with his mother in Los Angeles. While his family exposed him to different types of music like Nirvana, he discovered rap in Los Angeles inadvertently buying a CD that featured music from 50 Cent, who became one of his biggest influences.

Career 
He released his debut mixtape Ghetto Disneyland on April 7, 2014. The mixtape received positive reviews, praising his lyrics and the mixtape being mostly self-produced. On May 13, 2015, he released a music video for his self-produced first single "Ride" off his upcoming EP 1999 Parachutes.

On July 19, 2019, Skinny released the single and music video for "Never Snitch (Alhumdulilah)". The song charted on Apple Music Middle East, and is on YouTube. On September 13, 2019, Skinny released his album, Thank You For Nothing. The album reached a peak of number one on Apple Music Middle East.

Discography 
Studio albums

 Ghetto Disneyland (2014)
 1999 Parachutes (2016)
 Thank You For Nothing (2019)
 Have A Nice Trip (2022)

Singles

 Ride (2015)
 Spaceships In the Sky (2015)
 Living Like (feat. Skeme) (2015)
 Cookies & Swisher Sweets (2016)
 Best Friends (2016)
 Wonderful (2016)
 Drugs (2017)
 Night Shift (2017)
 Gra$$ (2017)
 No Problems (2018)
 Enemies (2018)
 Blessings (feat. Liife) (2018)
 Pass Out (2018)
 Never Snitch (2019)
 My Blocka (2020)
 Saudi Most Wanted (2022)
 Tamam (feat. Fat Money) (2022)
 Salam (with Swizz Beatz & French Montana) (2022)

Extended plays

 Late Night Blvd - EP (2017)

References 

1988 births
Alternative hip hop musicians
Living people
American hip hop musicians
American record producers
People from Riyadh
Saudi Arabian people of American descent
Hip hop musicians from California
Musicians from Los Angeles
Saudi Arabian hip hop